Michael Robert Witteck (February 21, 1964 - March 15, 1990) was an American football linebacker who played one season with the New York Jets of the National Football League. He played college football at Northwestern University and attended Valley Stream North High School in Franklin Square, New York. He was also a member of the Washington Commandos of the Arena Football League.

References

External links
Just Sports Stats
College stats
Fanbase profile

1964 births
1990 deaths
American football linebackers
Northwestern Wildcats football players
New York Jets players
Washington Commandos players
Sportspeople from Queens, New York
Players of American football from New York City
People from Franklin Square, New York
Valley Stream North High School alumni
National Football League replacement players